"Time Is Tight" is an instrumental recorded by Booker T. & the M.G.'s for their soundtrack to the 1968 film UpTight.

Background
The group recorded two versions of the song – the shorter (3:14), slower version was released as a single in 1969, and became one of the biggest hits of the group's career, peaking at #7 R&B and #6 Pop. The longer (4:55) version (which was included on the official soundtrack album) is played at a faster tempo than the single version, and features an extended introduction and an instrumental 'breakdown' section, neither of which was included in the single version.

Personnel
 Booker T. Jones – organ
 Steve Cropper – guitar
 Al Jackson Jr. – drums
 Donald "Duck" Dunn – bass

Charts

Weekly charts

Year-end charts

Cover versions
The Clash recorded a notable cover, which they had previously used as a "warm-up" in live performances. The song appears on their 1980 singles compilation album Black Market Clash, and also on their 1994 album Super Black Market Clash. (The Clash's arrangement differs from the original in one major respect – it modulates to D for the 'chorus' section, whereas the MG's version modulates to G.)
A rendition appears on The Shadows album XXV.
The Blues Brothers used the song as an intro to their shows in a medley with Otis Redding's "I Can't Turn You Loose". It is featured in The Blues Brothers film as well as in the 1983 mini-album Dancin' wid da Blues Brothers.

Popular culture
The song was played by BBC Radio 1 DJ Johnnie Walker in the early 1970s as the back up music to the weekly BBC chart rundowns.  These were published by the British Market Research Bureau on the Tuesday and then broadcast later that day on 247 metres medium wave.

References

External links
 Allmusic song review

Booker T. & the M.G.'s songs
The Clash songs
1969 singles
1960s instrumentals
Songs written by Steve Cropper
Songs written by Al Jackson Jr.
1968 songs
Stax Records singles
Songs written by Booker T. Jones
Songs written for films
The Blues Brothers songs